Ali Douglas Newman (born Jason Douglas Newman, July 30, 1977), better known by his stage name Brother Ali, is an American rapper, community activist, and member of the Rhymesayers Entertainment hip hop collective. He has released seven albums, four EPs, and a number of singles and collaborations.

Early life
Ali was born in Madison, Wisconsin. He has albinism, a disorder characterized by the complete or partial absence of pigment in the skin, hair, and eyes. He moved with his family to Michigan for a few years and then settled in Minneapolis, Minnesota in 1992. He attended Robbinsdale Cooper High School in New Hope, Minnesota.

Ali is Caucasian (white American), but he has spoken of feeling more accepted by Black classmates than white ones: "It's not like black kids didn't make fun of me, but it was different. It wasn't done in a way to exclude me. It wasn't done in a way to make me feel like not even a human being, not even a person." He could relate to them because they were also judged by their skin color.

Ali began rapping at age eight. He has stated that he was influenced by hip-hop culture at a very early age. In an interview with Huck magazine, he stated "Ever since I was a little kid, I've always been into hip-hop. I started beatboxing when I was about seven years old. Eventually, that led to me falling in love with the words." He has named Rakim, Chuck D, and KRS-ONE as early influences.

Appearances

Television
On August 13, 2007, Brother Ali appeared on The Late Late Show and performed his single "Uncle Sam Goddamn" from The Undisputed Truth. On October 19, 2007, Ali appeared on Late Night with Conan O'Brien and performed "Take Me Home" from The Undisputed Truth. On December 16, 2009, Ali appeared on Late Night with Jimmy Fallon and was featured with late night band The Roots.

Podcasts

On July 24, 2013, Brother Ali appeared on the Maximum Fun podcast Judge John Hodgman as an "Expert Witness".

On April 4, 2017, he appeared on The Combat Jack Show: "The Brother Ali Episode" and on October 19, 2017, on BuzzFeed's See Something Say Something podcast.

On April 5, 2018, he appeared on Max Fun's Heat Rocks podcast.

On Jan 1, 2023, he appeared on The Duncan Trussell Family Hour podcast.

Films
Ali appeared in Sacha Jenkins' 2018 documentary Word is Bond.

Personal life
Ali has a son, Faheem, from his first marriage, and a daughter, Stacy, from his second marriage in 2006. His music frequently addresses his role as a father, parent, and husband. The song "Real As Can Be" off his 2009 EP The Truth Is Here refers to the impending birth of his daughter, and on the song "Fresh Air", which is on his 2009 album Us, he goes on to say "Just got married last year/ treated so good that it ain't even fair/ already got a boy, now the baby girl's here/ Bought us a house like the Berenstain Bears."

Ali often makes fun of the media's constant urge to mention his albinism in the first lines of their reviews or newspaper articles. He is also legally blind, a condition which is caused by his albinism.

In an article titled "The Art of Mourning in America", Brother Ali said his favorite food is sweet potato pie. The interview was conducted during the month of Ramadan and Ali performed a freestyle: "Lifelong starvation, every month is Ramadan / Walk in the crib and I'm surprised that the power's on."

Religion
Ali converted to Islam at age 15 and followed Imam Warith Deen Mohammed. During this time, Ali was selected to join a group of students on a Malaysian study tour, in which they explored ways that a more liberal Islamic society could peacefully coexist with different religions.

Ali credits his conversion to Islam to KRS-ONE, whom he met during a lecture at age 13 at a local Minnesotan university. When asked about his faith, Ali stated, "KRS-ONE was actually the one who told me I should read Malcolm X. He assigned The Autobiography of Malcolm X to me; I read it, and that's what led to me becoming a Muslim."

Activism
Many of Brother Ali's themes of social justice are incorporated into his lyrics, though he also takes part in activism outside of the music. He primarily focuses on themes of racial inequality, slavery, and critiquing the United States government, though overarching themes of hope, acceptance, and rising from sorrow are also often present. Much attention was garnered through Ali's album The Undisputed Truth, as it heavily criticized much about the United States' political system. After the music video for "Uncle Sam Goddamn" was released in 2007, it quickly gained much attention, and shortly after, the United States Department of Homeland Security froze a money transfer to his record label.

In 2012, Ali was arrested along with thirty-seven others while occupying the home of a Minneapolis resident to fight the house's foreclosure. The goal of the protesters was to block the eviction of the family through their assembly and occupancy, but they were unsuccessful. Ali ended up using his celebrity as a platform to discuss these events, and bring them to the attention of his audience.

Ali deals heavily with the notion of privilege. He stated in an interview with Yes! magazine that "The best definition of privilege I've heard is anything you don't have to wrestle with, that you don't have to think about." Ali feels a certain obligation to act politically, as he is unwilling to sit aside after experiencing all he has. He states, "I feel like that's my job, and I feel like within the last few years I fully woke up to that, found the courage to understand that, and stepped out like that."

While performing at a concert in 2015, Brother Ali endorsed Bernie Sanders for president of the United States, as a candidate in the upcoming 2016 presidential election. He praised Sanders for saying "Black lives matter" at a presidential debate, a reference to the social movement. In November 2019, Brother Ali performed at a Bernie Sanders rally in Minneapolis, Minnesota, alongside Representative Ilhan Omar.

Discography

Studio albums

Mixtapes

EPs

Guest appearances

See also 
 Underground hip hop
 Twin Cities hip hop

References

Further reading
Hess, Mickey. "Volume II: The Midwest, The South, and Beyond". Hip Hop in America: A Regional Guide. Santa Barbara, CA: Greenwood, 2010. 368–70. Print.
Jones, D. Marvin. "Part 1: Racing Culture/Erasing Race". Fear of a Hip-hop Planet: America's New Dilemma. Santa Barbara: Praeger, 2013. 33–39. Print.
Tepper, Fabien. "Rapper Brother Ali on Privilege, Hope, and Other People's Stories". YES! Magazine. Positive Futures Network, February 18, 2013.
Ali, Brother. "The Intersection of Homophobia and Hip Hop: Where Tyler Met Frank". The Huffington Post. September 7, 2012.

External links

1977 births
American Muslims
Converts to Islam
Hip hop activists
Living people
Musicians from Madison, Wisconsin
People with albinism
Rappers from Wisconsin
Rhymesayers Entertainment artists
American male rappers
Midwest hip hop musicians
American hip hop record producers
21st-century American rappers
21st-century American male musicians